A phobia is an extreme or irrational fear of an object or situation.

Phobia may also refer to:
 -phobia, about the suffixes -phobia, -phobic, -phobe

Film
 Phobia (1980 film), a Canadian film directed by John Huston
 Phobia (1988 film), an Australian film by John Dingwall
 Phobia (2008 film), or 4bia, a Thai horror film also known as 4bia 
 Phobia (2013 film), an American independent horror film
 Phobia (2016 film), an Indian psychological thriller film

Music
 Phobia (band), an American grindcore band
 Phobia (Breaking Benjamin album), 2006
 Phobia (The Kinks album) or the title song, 1993
 ...Phobia, an album by Benassi Bros., 2005
 Phobia, an album by Torture Killer, 2013
 "Phobias" (song), by Johnny Orlando, 2020
 "Phobia", a song by Flowered Up, 1990
 "Phobia", a song by HRVY, 2017
 "Phobia", a song by Kreator from Outcast, 1997
 "Phobia", a song by Nothing But Thieves from Moral Panic, 2020

Other
 Phobia (comics), a supervillain in the DC Comics universe

See also
 Irrational fear (disambiguation)